HDMS Ejnar Mikkelsen is a Royal Danish Navy patrol vessel.
Launched in November 2007, she is the second vessel of the Knud Rasmussen class. The normal patrol area of the Ejnar Mikkelsen, and her sister ships, will be the waters around Greenland.

The  and the Ejnar Mikkelsen participated with Danish air elements in sovereignty and Search and Rescue exercises off Greenland's west coast in September 2009.
The vessels patrol took them to the Nares Strait, close to Hans Island, the approaches to the Northwest Passage, and to Lancaster Sound.

References

External links 
 A five second clip of the ship in a Greenpeace video.
 Landing a helicopter on the ship.

Knud Rasmussen-class patrol vessels
Ships built in Denmark
2007 ships
Patrol vessels of Denmark